Change of Habit is a 1969 American crime drama musical film directed by William A. Graham and starring Elvis Presley and Mary Tyler Moore. Written by James Lee, S.S. Schweitzer, and Eric Bercovici, based on a story by John Joseph and Richard Morris, the film is about three Catholic nuns, preparing for their final vows, who are sent to a rough inner city neighborhood dressed as lay missionaries to work at a clinic run by a young doctor. Their lives become complicated by the realities they face in the inner city, and by the doctor who falls in love with one of the nuns.

The film was produced by Joe Connelly for NBC Productions and distributed by Universal Pictures. Filmed on location in the Los Angeles area and at the Universal Studios during March and April 1969, Change of Habit was released in the United States on November 10, 1969. It spent four weeks on the Variety Box Office Survey, peaking at #17.

Change of Habit was Presley's 31st and final film acting role; his remaining film appearances were in concert documentaries. The film was Moore's fourth and final film under her brief Universal Pictures contract; she would not appear in another theatrical movie until Ordinary People in 1980. Moore and Edward Asner, who also appears in the film, would go on to star in The Mary Tyler Moore Show, which premiered in September of the following year.

Plot
Dr. John Carpenter is a physician in a ghetto clinic who falls for a co-worker, Michelle Gallagher, unaware that she is a nun.

Elvis stars as a professional man for the first and only time in his career. Dr. Carpenter heads a clinic serving an underprivileged community in a major metropolis with an ethnic Puerto Rican population. He is surprised to be offered assistance by three women. Unknown to him, the three are nuns in street clothing who want to aid the community but are afraid the local residents might be reluctant to seek help if their true identities were known. The nuns are also facing opposition from the rude and arrogant priest from the local parish. Dr. Carpenter and the nuns are shown dealing with a non-verbal, angry autistic girl named Amanda, a boy with a severe speech impediment, and a man beaten by loan shark enforcers. The nuns at times are sexually harassed by loiterers as well as an attempted rape scene.

Carpenter falls for Sister Michelle Gallagher, played by wholesome Mary Tyler Moore, but Sister Michelle's true vocation remains unknown to Dr. Carpenter. She also has feelings for the doctor but is reluctant to leave the order. The film concludes with Sister Michelle and Sister Irene entering a church where Dr. Carpenter is singing to pray for guidance to make her choice.

Notable plot points

Autism
In the film, the character of Amanda, a young autistic child, is believed to be the first portrayal of autism in a film by name. It accurately portrays the common misdiagnosis of deafness and once Amanda's autism is defined, she is treated with a therapy that was then quite common: Rage Reduction therapy, also known as Attachment therapy. This treatment has since fallen out of favor, now considered pseudoscientific.  Indeed, the scene was supervised by Robert Zaslow, known as the father of rage reduction therapy.  Zaslow is credited as an additional member of the film's crew as "(supervisor: rage reduction scene - as Dr. Robert W. Zaslow)"

Folk music at Mass
In an era when Folk Mass was just catching on, Elvis' character is seen playing guitar and singing "Let Us Pray" in an early depiction of folk music at Mass.

Cast
(in credits order)

 Elvis Presley as Dr. John Carpenter
 Mary Tyler Moore as Sister Michelle
 Barbara McNair as Sister Irene
 Jane Elliot as Sister Barbara
 Leora Dana as Mother Joseph
 Edward Asner as Lt. Moretti
 Robert Emhardt as The Banker
 Regis Toomey as Father Gibbons
 Doro Merande as Rose
 Ruth McDevitt as Lily
 Richard Carlson as Bishop Finley
 Nefti Millet as Julio Hernandez
 Laura Figueroa as Desiree
 Lorena Kirk as Amanda
 Virginia Vincent as Miss Parker
 David Renard as Colombians 
 William Elliott as Robbie (as Bill Elliott)
 Rodolfo Hoyos Jr. as Mr. Hernandez (as Rodolfo Hoyos)
 Kay Koury as on carousel
Charlie Hodge  as patient

Uncredited Cast:

 Mario Aniov as 1st Young Man
 Ray Ballard as Ice Cream Clerk
 Jim Beach as Father Witkowski
 Timothy Carey as Ajax Market Manager
 Rita Conde as Woman in Market
 Steve Conte as Man in Scene 166
 Frank Corsentino as 2nd Man
 John Daheim as 1st Underling
 Robert De Anda as Teammate
 Tony De Costa as Chino
 Paul Factor as 3rd Man
 Linda Garay as Expectant Mother
 Stella Garcia as Maria
 Pepe Hern as Man in Scene 93
 Fanita James as Backup Singer
 Jean King as Backup Singer
 Ji-Tu Cumbuka as ghetto apartment resident 
 Darlene Love as Backup Singer
 A Martinez as Second Teen
 Troy Melton as 2nd Underling
 Lilith Miles as 1st Stiletto Deb
 Lenny Montana as Grocer
 Araceli Rey as Senora Gavilan
 Ruben Rodriguez as Church Drummer
 Stanley Schneider as Traffic Cop
 Harry Swoger as Fat Man
 Alex Tinne as Tony
 Alex Val as Tomas
 Roberto Vargas as Cuban Mainliner
 Len Wayland as Police Sergeant
 Caitlin Wyles as 2nd Stiletto Deb

Production
By 1969, Presley's future in Hollywood was under threat. Although still financially successful, mainly due to the "make 'em quick, make 'em cheap" attitude of Presley's manager Colonel Tom Parker, Presley's films had been making less profit in recent years. When Parker had struggled to find any studio willing to pay Presley's usual $1 million fee, he struck a deal with NBC to produce one feature film, and a TV special entitled Elvis. NBC would pay Presley $1.25 million for both features, and Parker was happy in the knowledge that he was still able to earn $1 million for his client.

The film Change of Habit had been announced in 1967, with Mary Tyler Moore signing up in October 1968. It was considered a Moore vehicle until January 1969 when Presley signed on to take the lead role.

Although set in New York City, the film was shot in the Los Angeles area and at the Universal Studios lot during March and April 1969. It was released nationwide in the United States on November 10, 1969 and spent four weeks on the Variety Box Office Survey, peaking at #17.

Mary Tyler Moore and Edward Asner would soon become co-stars of her self-named The Mary Tyler Moore Show, one of television's enduring hits from 1970-77. In Change of Habit, however, they shared no scenes.

Reception
A. H. Weiler of The New York Times reviewed the film on a double bill with House of Cards and noted that both were "merely exemplary of professional technique and dialogue rather than memorable characterization and emotion." Variety wrote that "its intriguing idea has a well-enough-constructed plotline to flesh out its premise for good family fare ... Presley displays his customary easy presence." Kevin Thomas of the Los Angeles Times wrote, "Today we're simply too much aware how agonizing social injustices can be for them to be treated with the breezy, jaunty touch of simple-minded light comedy ... to watch all this frantically bouncy, thoroughly bogus business is as discomforting as listening to chalk screech across a blackboard."

Change of Habit holds a 10% rating on Rotten Tomatoes based on ten reviews, making it Presley's worst-received film on Rotten Tomatoes.

Soundtrack
When Presley entered Decca Universal Studio on March 5, 1969, for two days to record his final dramatic motion picture soundtrack, what would come to be known as the comeback television special had already been broadcast, its attendant album had been his first top ten LP in four years, and he had just finished the sessions at American Sound Studio yielding From Elvis in Memphis and the top ten singles "In the Ghetto" and "Suspicious Minds" that would cement his resurgence as a force in American popular music. He had a month-long engagement at the International Hotel in Paradise, Nevada lined up in August, his first live performances in eight years, and clearly now had turned his career around.

A song recorded at American, "Rubberneckin'", would be used in the film and subsequently issued as the b-side of RCA single 47-9768 "Don't Cry Daddy" in conjunction with the movie premiere. Four songs would be recorded at the soundtrack sessions, of which "Let's Be Friends" would not be used in the film. The four songs would be released commercially on budget albums, "Let's Be Friends," the title track "Change of Habit," and "Have A Happy" on Let's Be Friends the following year, with "Let Us Pray" issued on the 1971 album You'll Never Walk Alone.

Some reference sources erroneously list an outtake from the earlier Presley film, Charro!, "Let's Forget About the Stars" (a song also released on the Let's Be Friends album), as being a song recorded for Change of Habit.

Personnel
 Elvis Presley - vocals / piano (played live)
 The Blossoms - backing vocals
 B.J. Baker, Sally Stevens, Jackie Ward - backing vocals
 Howard Roberts, Dennis Budimir, Mike Deasy, Robert Bain - electric guitar
 Roger Kellaway - piano
 Joe Mondragon, Lyle Ritz, Max Bennett - double bass
 Carol Kaye - electric bass
 Carl O'Brien - drums

Film music track listing
 "Change of Habit" (Buddy Kaye and Ben Weisman)
 "Let's Be Friends" (Chris Arnold, David Martin, Geoffrey Morrow) (not used in film)
 "Let Us Pray" (Buddy Kaye and Ben Weisman)
 "Have A Happy" (Buddy Kaye, Dolores Fuller, Ben Weisman)
 "Rubberneckin'" (Dory Jones and Bunny Warren) (Not initially recorded for the film, but added to the soundtrack and performed by Elvis on camera)

See also
 List of American films of 1969
 Elvis Presley on film and television
 Elvis Presley discography

References

External links
 
 
 
 
 
 Change of Habit at DVD Verdict

1969 films
1969 drama films
1960s English-language films
Films about autism
Films about Catholic nuns
Films about physicians
Films set in New York City
Films shot in California
NBC Productions films
Universal Pictures films
Films directed by William Graham (director)
Films scored by Billy Goldenberg
American drama films
1960s American films